José Jesús Gurrola Castro (born 15 April 1998) is a Mexican professional footballer who plays as a winger for Liga de Expansión MX club Sonora.

Honours
Mexico U17
CONCACAF U-17 Championship: 2015

References

External links
 

Living people
1998 births
Footballers from Sonora
Sportspeople from Hermosillo
Association football midfielders
C.D. Guadalajara footballers
Atlético San Luis footballers
21st-century Mexican people
Mexican footballers